"There's a Green Hill Out in Flanders (There's a Green Hill Up in Maine)" is a World War I era song released in 1917. Lyrics and music were written by Allan J. Flynn. Al Piantadosi & Co. of New York City. The song was written for both voice and piano.

On October 29, 1917, Albert Wiederhold recorded a version of the song with conductor Josef Pasternack. The song was produced by Victor Records. The song was also performed by Alan Turner.

There are four versions of the sheet music cover. All versions feature soldiers charging a battlefield with explosions above their heads. The only difference is one version features an inset photo of Burns and Fabrito, another features an inset photo of Helen Morretti, and one features an inset photo of a woman. The final version does not have an inset photo. The cover was designed by Starmer.

The sheet music can be found at Pritzker Military Museum & Library.

The song tells the story of a mother, whose only son was killed in the war. The chorus is as follows:

References

External links
Another version of the sheet music cover at Mississippi State Library
View the song MP3 and sheet music at the Illinois Digital Archive

1917 songs
Songs of World War I
Works set in Flanders
Songs about Belgium
Songs about the United States